This article lists all known films and series based on Lego construction toys, usually co-produced by The Lego Group.

History
Brickfilms (films using Lego) have existed since the 1970s. In 2003, Lego officially made its first partnership to make films based on its toy property. They chose Bionicle as the property and they made a deal with Miramax to make a trilogy of Bionicle films. After the trilogy ended, a new trilogy based on Bionicle was planned with Universal after the Miramax film contract ended and the first film in the new trilogy would be titled Bionicle: The Legend Reborn. But plans broke down between Lego and Universal, resulting in the fifth film being cancelled. However, a film was later released, entitled Lego: The Adventures of Clutch Powers. The film received positive reviews from fans and critics and, after the DVD release, a sequel was set to star Clutch as the hero again. A short film based on Clutch Powers was later released but a full sequel never materialized.

In the summer of 2009, Lego made a deal with Warner Bros. to make a film based on its property. It would feature many themes and characters and would be released as the first Lego film in cinemas. In 2009, Lego also planned the concept for the now successful theme Lego Ninjago. In 2011, Lego released a TV series titled Lego Ninjago: Masters of Spinjitzu. In 2012, the untitled Lego film was titled Lego: The Piece of Resistance. Meanwhile, the Ninjago series achieved popularity. A video game based on the show was later released and the show reached its planned conclusion after a two-year run.

A new show titled Legends of Chima aired in January 2013 and was intended to be Ninjago's successor. The show received mixed reviews, however, with Lego fans instead demanding the return of Ninjago. Lego eventually gave into fan demands and revived Ninjago: Masters of Spinjitzu in 2014 with a new season. Ninjago continued to release 1–2 seasons every year. The "Piece of Resistance" film would be renamed The Lego Movie by Warner Bros. and was released in February 2014. Due to the success of the film, a Ninjago film was announced to be released in 2017, and a Lego Movie sequel was announced to be released in 2018. In 2014, Mixels also debuted. In late 2015, Nexo Knights was introduced, replacing Legends of Chima.

In late 2016, Ninjago released a Halloween TV special for its five-year anniversary. On 10 February 2017, a spin-off film of The Lego Movie titled The Lego Batman Movie was released in theatres.

On 22 September 2017, The Lego Ninjago Movie was released in theatres, which was based on the characters of the Ninjago series, but was not connected to the events in the television show.

An additional film with Warner Bros named "Billion Brick Race" was planned, but cancelled in 2018 for unknown reasons. Little is known about what the film was supposed to be, with the exception of some concept artwork shared by the Director, Jorge Gutierrez.

In March 2019, Ninjago released an 88-minute TV movie called March of the Oni on Cartoon Network, which also celebrated the 100th episode of the show. The show reached its 11th year of airing having released season 15 in 2022.

In April 2020, Universal Pictures announced it had established a five-year deal for exclusive rights for the production of further Lego movies with The Lego Group; the four existing Lego films made by Warner Bros. (The Lego Movie, The Lego Movie 2, The Lego Batman Movie, and The Lego Ninjago Movie) would stay with that studio. This move potentially allows Universal to make Lego films based on its own catalog of properties such as Jurassic Park, Fast & Furious and Despicable Me.

Feature films

Released theatrical films

Direct-to-video

Short films

TV specials

Television series

Series by themes

Lego City 

 Lego City Shorts (2011–present)
 Lego City Adventures (2019–present)
 Lego City 4D - Officer in Pursuit (2019) [short film]

Lego Ninjago
Ninjago (2011-2022)
Lego Ninjago Day of The Departed (2016) [TV special]
Lego Ninjago Movie (2017) [Also part of The Lego Movie franchise]
Lego Ninjago Master of 4th Dimension (2018) [Short Film]
Lego Ninjago March of the Oni (2019) [TV film]

Bionicle
Bionicle: Mask of Light (2003)
Bionicle 2: Legends of Metru Nui (2004)
Bionicle 3: Web of Shadows (2005)
Bionicle: The Legend Reborn (2009)
Lego Bionicle: The Journey to One (2016)

Clutch Powers
Lego: The Adventures of Clutch Powers (2010)
Lego Clutch Powers: Bad Hair Day (2010)
Lego City: A Clutch Powers 4-D Adventure (2011)

Lego Star Wars
Lego Star Wars: Revenge of the Brick (2005)
Lego Star Wars: The Quest for R2-D2 (2009)
Lego Star Wars: Bombad Bounty (2010)
Lego Star Wars: The Padawan Menace (2011)
Lego Star Wars: The Empire Strikes Out (2012)
Lego Star Wars: The Yoda Chronicles (2013)
Lego Star Wars: The New Yoda Chronicles (2014)
Lego Star Wars: Droid Tales (2015)
Lego Star Wars: The Resistance Rises (2016)
Lego Star Wars: The Freemaker Adventures (2016–2017)
Lego Star Wars: All-Stars (2018)
 The Lego Star Wars Holiday Special (2020)
 Lego Star Wars: Terrifying Tales (2021)
 Lego Star Wars: Summer Vacation (2022)

Lego Friends
Lego Friends of Heartlake City (2012-2017)
Lego Friends: Girlz 4 Life (2015)
Lego Friends: The Power of Friendship (2016)
Lego Friends: Girls on a Mission (2018–present)

The Lego Movie
The Lego Movie (2014)
The Lego Movie: 4D – A New Adventure (2016)
The Lego Batman Movie (2017) [also part of Lego DC franchise]
The Lego Ninjago Movie (2017) [Also part of Lego Ninjago franchise]
Unikitty! (2017–2020)
The Lego Movie 2: The Second Part (2019)

Lego Super Heroes

Lego DC
Lego Batman: Bricks, Bats and Bad Guys (2006)
Lego Batman: The Movie – DC Super Heroes Unite (2013)
Lego DC Comics: Batman Be-Leaguered (2014)
Lego DC Comics Super Heroes: Justice League vs. Bizarro League (2015)
Lego DC Comics Super Heroes: Justice League – Attack of the Legion of Doom (2015)
Lego DC Comics Super Heroes: Justice League – Cosmic Clash (2016)
Lego DC Comics Super Heroes: Justice League – Gotham City Breakout (2016)
The Lego Batman Movie (2017) (also part of The Lego Movie series)
Lego DC Super Hero Girls: Galactic Wonder (2017)
Lego DC Super Hero Girls: Brain Drain (2017)
Lego DC Comics Super Heroes: The Flash (2018)
Lego DC Super Hero Girls: Super-Villain High (2018)
Lego DC Comics Super Heroes: Aquaman: Rage of Atlantis (2018)
Lego DC Batman: Family Matters (2019)
Lego DC: Shazam!: Magic and Monsters (2020)

Lego Marvel
Lego Marvel Super Heroes: Maximum Overload (2013)
Lego Marvel Super Heroes: Avengers Reassembled (2015)
Lego Marvel Super Heroes - Guardians of the Galaxy: The Thanos Threat (2017)
Lego Marvel Super Heroes: Black Panther: Trouble in Wakanda (2018)
Lego Marvel Spider-Man: Vexed by Venom (2019)
Lego Marvel Avengers: Climate Conundrum (2020)
Lego Marvel Avengers: Loki in Training (2021)
Lego Marvel Avengers: Time Twisted (2022)

Lego Elves
Lego Elves: Unite the Magic (2015)
Lego Elves (2015-2018)
Lego Elves: Dragons To Save, Time To Be Brave (2016)
Lego Elves: Down a Dark Path (2016)
 Elves: Secret of Elvendale (2017)

Lego Scooby-Doo
 Knight Time Terror (2015)
 Haunted Hollywood (2016)
 Blowout Beach Bash (2017)

Lego Jurassic World
Lego Jurassic World: The Indominus Escape (2016)
Lego Jurassic World: The Secret Exhibit (2018)
Lego Jurassic World: Legend of Isla Nublar (2019)
Lego Jurassic World: Double Trouble (2020)

Other series
Monty Python & the Holy Grail in Lego (2001)
Galidor: Defenders of the Outer Dimension (2002)
Little Robots (2003–2005)
Lego Indiana Jones and the Raiders of the Lost Brick (2008)
Lego Atlantis: The Movie (2010)
Lego Hero Factory (2010–2014)
Legends of Chima (2013–2014)
The Simpsons: "Brick Like Me" (2014)
Mixels (2014–2016)
Nexo Knights (2016–2017)
Lego Hidden Side (2019-2020)
Lego Monkie Kid (2020–present)

References